Trapezia can refer to:

 Trapezia, a genus of crabs
 plural form of the word trapezium